The Durham Public Schools district is a public school district in Durham, North Carolina. Formed in 1992 with the merger of Durham's previous two school districts, it is 8th largest school system in North Carolina as of November 2020. There are currently 55 public schools in the system, consisting of 31 elementary (K-5), 9 middle (6-8), 2 secondary (6-12), 11 high (9-12), 1 alternative, 1 hospital school, and 1 virtual academy (K-12). There is currently another elementary school under construction in the southern portion of the county, Elementary School "F". Durham's schools are traditionally named after notable members of the local community (such as George Watts or Rogers-Herr [Named after long-time Durham school teachers Maude Rogers and Margurite Herr), or the area in which they are built (such as Bethesda or Eno Valley).

Formation
In 1927, Hope Valley School was built for grades 1 through 11. It was the first public school in Southwestern Durham. Changes to the Hope Valley School facility were made in 1941 and 1952. the school was subsequently downgraded to an elementary school with the opening of Southern High School in the fall of 1956. In 1964, Jordan High School on Garrett Road was constructed.

Integration history
Prior to integration, white students attended Durham High School and black students attended Hillside High School.

In 1956, Dr. Martin Luther King Jr. spoke at Hillside High School, which was one of the Southeast's highest-ranked black high schools.

In 1957, the parents of Joycelyn McKissick and Elaine Richardson sued for their daughters to be reassigned to Durham High School of the Durham City School System.

In 1958, Rencher N. Harris became the first black member of Durham City Board of Education.

In 1959, the Durham City School Board allowed reassignment of eight black pupils to previously all-white schools. The first black students to integrate were Anita Brame and Lucy Jones at Brogden Junior High (now Brogden Middle School). In 1959, Joycelyn McKissick became the first African American student at Durham High School (now Durham School of the Arts).

In September 1963, Charmaine McKissick among eight other minority youths were the first to desegregate into the Durham Public School system at the Elementary level. Along with her Floyd McKissick Jr, they entered into the North Durham Elementary School. Charmaine McKissick was the youngest to participate in the desegregation. She recalls, "My family prepared us all, every day, with the armor to return the next. "  Not many students are willing to talk about their experiences. McKissick-Melton also states, "It is too painful."  She goes onto write, "There are a few exceptions such as my good friend Janice Guess, whom I encouraged to write her story, and she did in, 'Little Black Girls Want Pearls Too.'"  The integration was a harsh burden for a lot of those children and families involved. McKissick also writes, "The hurt is so deep from the wounds of more than fifty years ago that they still feel the pain."
McKissick-Melton also write, "We had some difficult times but nothing compared to the older students, including my sisters before me. I had it easier because the kids had not had enough time to learn and display their hatred, racist and their bigoted behavior."  Charmaine McKissick-Melton, PH. D, has since then decided to give back to the Durham Community as an Associate Professor in the Department of Mass Communication at North Carolina Central University. She is also the daughter of the late Evelyn and Floyd McKissick, Jude Floyd B. McKissick, Sr.

In 1968, The National Association for the Advancement of Colored People (NAACP) sued the Durham County School System in order to integrate its schools. The Durham County School Board's integration plan was accepted by the Federal District Court in Greensboro. The plan stated that all high schools and junior high schools would be integrated in the fall of 1969. The Federal District Judge gave an extra year for elementary schools due to space limitations and the need to purchase mobile units.

Durham County School System's principals had all been hired during legal segregation, so there was much discussion in the community about how successful integration would be in Durham County. One problem that existed was at Southern High School whose principal was Sidney Ray. Southern High School's mascot was the Rebel, and the high school used the confederate flag, and that the community thought that part of town was the redneck part of town. The mascot was later changed to the Spartan. There was less concern about Jordan High School because it had been attended by more affluent families of all colors. At Northern High School, there was a mix. The school had one of the toughest principals in the district.

In 1969, the U.S. Supreme Court in Alexander vs. Holmes County Board of Education reversed the decision of the Fifth Circuit Court of Appeals, ruling that continued operation of segregated schools in Mississippi was no longer permissible. The NAACP filed suit in the Court of Appeals in Richmond saying, based on Alexander-Holmes Decision, they wanted all of Durham's elementary schools integrated. The Fourth Circuit Court of Appeals agreed to hear the case in December. The judge stated that Durham County and City Schools had been given 15 years to accomplish integration and had failed. The Fourth Circuit Court of Appeals ruled integration would happen immediately.
 
In the fall of 1969, all three high schools (Southern, C.E. Jordan, and Northern) and junior high schools were integrated as ordered. Durham City Schools' high schools were Durham High School and Hillside High School, which were at this time were still the largest public schools in both the city and county of Durham.

In 1970, Durham County elementary schools were fully integrated. Durham City schools began to decline after integration. Middle- and upper-class began emigrating out of the Durham City School System to the Durham County School System. The Durham City School System became populated with poorer people. Hillside High School, almost entirely black, maintained a good number of middle-class blacks. Due to immense migration, blacks began to control the Durham City School System and elected a majority black school board and a black superintendent.

A merger attempt of the Durham City School System and the Durham County School System was made in 1972. There were several more attempt that failed to gain support. Finally, in 1992 an agreement was reached. During the merger, the Durham County School System's junior high (grades 7, 8 & 9) and senior high (10, 11, & 12) format was abolished and the Durham City School System's format of middle schools (grades 6, 7 and 8) and high schools (grades 9, 10, 11 and 12) was implemented.

In 1992, the Durham County School System and the Durham City School System merged to form Durham Public Schools.

2022-2023 Board of Education
Board members are: 
 Bettina Umstead, Chair (District 2) - Term expires on July 1, 2026
 Jovonia Lewis, Vice Chair (Consolidated District A) - Term expires on July 1, 2024
 Natalie Beyer (District 4) - Term expires on July 1, 2026
 Emily Chávez (District 1)* - Term expires on July 1, 2026
 Millicent Rogers (Consolidated District B)* - Term expires July 1, 2024
 Matt Sears (District 3) - Term expires on July 1, 2026
 Alexandra Valladares (At Large) - Term expires on July 1, 2024
* swearing-in ceremony in July 8, 2022
 
(https://www.youtube.com/watch?v=g-9mhaWZ76U)

2021-2022 Board of Education
Board members are: 
 Bettina Umstead, Chair (District 2)
 Jovonia Lewis, Vice Chair (Consolidated District A)
 Natalie Beyer (District 4)
 Mike Lee (District 1)
 Frederick Xavier Ravin III (Consolidated District B)
 Matt Sears (District 3)
 Alexandra Valladares (At Large)

2020-2021 Board of Education
Board members are: 
 Bettina Umstead, Chair (District 2)
 Mike Lee, Vice Chair (District 1)
 Natalie Beyer (District 4)
 Jovonia Lewis (Consolidated District A)
 Frederick Xavier Ravin III (Consolidated District B)
 Matt Sears (District 3)
 Alexandra Valladares (At Large)

2019-2020 Board of Education
Board members are:
 Mike Lee, Chair (District 1)
 Bettina Umstead, Vice Chair (District 2)
 Natalie Beyer (District 4)
 Minnie Forte-Brown (Consolidated District A)
 Xavier Cason (Consolidated District B)
 Matt Sears (District 3)
 Steve Unruhe (At Large)

2018-2019 Board of Education
Board members are: 
(The swearing-in ceremony took place on July 10, 2018)  
 The chair is Mike Lee (District 1)
 The vice chair is Steve Unruhe (At Large)
 Natalie Beyer (District 4)
 Minnie Forte-Brown (Consolidated District A)
 Bettina Umstead (District 2)
 Xavier Cason (Consolidated District B)
 Matt Sears (District 3)

2017-2018 Board of Education
Board members are:
 The chair is Mike Lee (District 1)
 The vice chair is Steve Unruhe (At Large)
 Natalie Beyer (District 4)
 Minnie Forte-Brown (Consolidated District A)
 Bettina Umstead (District 2)
 Xavier Cason (Consolidated District B)
 Matt Sears (District 3)

2016-2017 Board of Education
Board members are:
 The chair is Mike Lee (District 1)
 The vice chair is Natalie Beyer (District 4)
 Minnie Forte-Brown (Consolidated District A)
 Bettina Umstead (District 2)
 Xavier Cason (Consolidated District B)
 Matt Sears (District 3)
 Steve Unruhe (At Large)

2014-2015 Board of Education
Board members are:
 The chair is Heidi Carter (Consolidated District B). Term expires June 30, 2016.
 The vice chair is Minnie Forte-Brown (Consolidated District A). Term expires June 30, 2016.
 Natalie Beyer (District 4) 
 Leigh Bordley (At Large) Term expires June 30, 2016
 Sendolo Diaminah
 Mike Lee
 Matt Sears

2013-2014 Board of Education
Board members are:
 The chair is Heidi Carter (Consolidated District B). Term expires June 30, 2016.
 The vice chair is Minni Forte-Brown (Consolidated District A). Term expires June 30, 2016.
 Natalie Beyer (District 4) Term expires June 30, 2014
 Leigh Bordley (At Large) Term expires June 30, 2016
 Nancy Cox (District 3) Term expires June 30, 2014
 Fredrick A. Davis (District 2) Term expires June 30, 2014
 Omega Curtis Parker (District 1) Term expires June 30, 2014

2010-2012 Board of Education
The chairman is Minnie Forte-Brown (District A). The vice chairman is Heidi Carter (District B). Board members are:
 Leigh Bordley (At Large)
 Omega Curtis Parker (District 1)
 Fredrick A. Davis (District 2)
 Nancy Cox (District 3)
 Natalie Beyer (District 4)

Superintendents
 -1975
 Mr. Lew W. Hannen
 1975
 Dr. Benjamin T. Brooks
 1988
 Dr. Cleveland Hammonds
 1990-1991
 Dr. Jerry D. Weast
 1992
 Kenneth Brunson
 1992-1993
 C. Owen Phillips
 1994-1996
 Theodore R. Drain
 1997-2006
 Dr. Ann T. Denlinger
 2006-2009
 Dr. Carl E. Harris
 January - June 2010
 H. Hank Hurd (as Interim Superintendent)
 July 1, 2010 - December 31, 2013
 Dr. Eric J. Becoats 
 January 1, 2014 - July 11, 2014 
 Hugh Osteen (as Interim Superintendent)
 July 14, 2014 – October 1, 2017
 Dr. Bert L'Homme
 October 1, 2017 - November 2017
 Aaron Beaulieu (as Interim Superintendent)
 November 2017 – Present
 Dr. Pascal Mubenga

Statistics
Durham Public Schools employs 4,697 people (2,243 teachers) and had 33,035 students in the 2016-2017 school year.  Durham Public Schools is the third largest employer in Durham, NC
 Pre-Kindergarten: 426
 Grades K-5: 15,799
 Grades 6-8: 6,753
 Grades 9-12: 10,483

Teacher salaries range from $39,375-$99,359 (includes local supplement and differential).

The school system utilizes more than 300 school buses to transport over 16,000 students throughout Durham every day.

Demographics
As of the 2017-2018 school year there were 33,072 students enrolled in Durham Public Schools.

Schools

High Schools (9-12)

Hillside

Hillside High School is a four-year public high school. Of more than 300 historically black high schools that once operated in the state before desegregation, only five remain today, with Hillside being the oldest. The school features the International Baccalaureate Program and the Business and Finance Academy. "Students may study electronics, engineering, and child care through the Workforce Development courses, as well as traditional business classes". The school mascot is the hornet. Hillside is known for performing arts such as their award-winning Marching Band and Drama Department. Hillside students come from many middle school areas such as Rogers-Herr, Githens, Lowes Grove, Shepard, Brogden, and Lakewood. Hillside enrolled 1370 students in the 2017-2018 school year. The schools current principal is Dr. William Logan.

Jordan

Charles E. Jordan High School is located on Garrett Road near Hope Valley Road in southwest Durham. The school mascot is the falcon. Jordan students come from many area middle schools such as Shepard, Githens, Lowe's Grove, and Rogers-Herr. The school features career pathways in Agriscience/Biotechnology and Commercial and Artistic Production. Other components of the Jordan community that have won national and state awards include the marching band, show choir, DECA (marketing and business), Future Farmers of America, Future Business Leaders of America, the foreign language program, and the school newspaper. Jordan enrolled 1,979 students in the 2017-2018 school year. The schools current principal is Susan Taylor.

Northern

Northern High School is a four-year public high school located in the northern part of Durham. Northern is one of Durham's seven public high schools. Students take 4 classes each day. Northern's mascot is a knight. Northern students come from some middle school such as Lucas, Brogden, and Carrington. Northern also offers specialty course programs like Culinary Arts, Astronomy, Sports Medicine, Mythology, and many more. Northern enrolled 1,536 students in the 2017-2018 school year. The schools current principal is Danny Gilfort. It is in the process of being rebuilt on a new site approximately two miles away.

Riverside

Riverside High School is a four-year public high school located in Northern Durham. Opened in 1991, this school is one of seven public high schools in the Durham Public School System. Riverside students come from some middle school areas such as Carrington, Brogden, and Lucas. Riverside is SACS & NCDPI accredited, has the Project Lead the Way (PLTW) Engineering Magnet, and the Air Force JROTC Magnet. Riverside enrolled 1,826 students in the 2017-2018 school year. The schools current principal is Tonya Williams.

Southern

Southern High School is a four-year public high school located in southern Durham. Southern is a 4A school, and has football, baseball, and basketball programs as well as the Symphonic Soul of the South Marching Band. Southern students mostly come from Neal and Brogden. Durham Public Schools, with the support of the New Schools Project of the Bill and Melinda Gates Foundation, has reinvented the high school experience at Southern School of Energy & Sustainability. Southern enrolled 1,429 students in the 2017-2018 school year. The schools current principal is Jerome Leathers.

Middle College

Middle College High School is located on the campus of Durham Tech. This high school is only for juniors and seniors. There were 197 students during the 2017-2018 school year. The current principal is Crystal Taylor-Simon

Other High Schools
 Josephine Dobbs Clement Early College
  City of Medicine Academy
 Hillside New Tech High School

Elementary Schools (K-5)

K-8 Schools (K-8)

Middle Schools (6-8)

K-12 Schools (K-12)

High Schools (9-12)

Secondary Schools (6-12)

Secondary schools

Durham School of the Arts

Durham School of the Arts (DSA) is a secondary (grades 6-12) magnet school located in downtown Durham, housing 1711 students. Its focus is on visual and performing arts. Offerings include extensive 3D and 2D art, dance, guitar, strings, band, photography, piano, acting, technical theater, and computer classes. Students are enrolled by a lottery system and can enroll as early as the sixth grade.

Lakeview School
Lakeview School is an alternative school for grades 6-12 to teach those who have a history of misbehavior.

Hospital School
 The Hospital School is located at Duke University Medical Center. This school teaches students with health conditions.

School for Creative Studies
The School for Creative Studies is a year-round secondary magnet school (grades 6-12) located at 5001 Red Mill Road, Durham, 27704. This school opened with 300 students (Grades 6, 7, 9) on July 1, 2013 in the same building that used to house Chewning Middle School. The principal is Renee Price.

Former schools
Lowes Grove Elementary School was in southern Durham. In 2016 the State Employees Credit Union proposed that Durham Public Schools build employee housing on the Lowes Grove property. In 2019 a bill was filed in the legislature to allow the district to do this.
W.G. Pearson Middle School
Chewning Year-Round Middle School
Bragtown School

References

External links

 Durham Public Schools Official website
 Durham Public Schools Facebook
 Durham Public Schools Twitter
 Durham Public Schools Instagram
 Oral History Interviews with Josephine Dobbs Clement ,  from Oral Histories of the American South

 
School districts in North Carolina